In baseball, a middle reliever or middle relief pitcher, is a relief pitcher who typically pitches during the fifth, sixth, and seventh innings of a standard baseball game. In leagues with no designated hitter, such as in the National League prior to 2022 and the Japanese Central League, a middle reliever often comes in after the starting pitcher has been pulled in favor of a pinch hitter. Middle relief pitchers are usually task to pitch one or two innings where they are then replaced in later innings by a left-handed specialist, setup pitcher, or closer due to deprivation of stamina and effectiveness, but middle relievers may sometimes pitch in these innings as well, especially during games which are close, tied or in extra innings.

References

Baseball pitching
Baseball strategy